David Mercer Duffus (born October 21, 1987 in Romford) is a rugby union footballer who plays at Scrum Half for Saracens F.C. in the Premiership and UK Elite 7's Series.

Duffus has been capped for England 7's as well England Students from U/16 to U/20. His previous clubs include Ulster and Edinburgh Rugby.

References 

1987 births
Living people
English rugby union players
Rugby union players from Romford